is a Japanese biathlete. She competed at the 1998 Winter Olympics and the 2002 Winter Olympics.

References

1973 births
Living people
Biathletes at the 1998 Winter Olympics
Biathletes at the 2002 Winter Olympics
Japanese female biathletes
Olympic biathletes of Japan
Place of birth missing (living people)